Agonidium jemjemense is a species of ground beetle in the subfamily Platyninae. It was described by Burgeon in 1937.

References

jemjemense
Beetles described in 1937